Sharif Nayyar (  24 April 2007), was a Pakistani film director. Having a career spanning over four decades, he directed his first film in 1947 in British Indiam and directed a total of 13 films including a Punjabi film. In Pakistani cinema, Nayyar is known for directing one of Lollywood's  earliest colour films, Naila (1965) and a Diamond jubilee film Dosti (1971). For directing these films, he received two Nigar Awards.

Life and career 
Nayyar was born in Lahore. He statred his career from acting in Laila Majnu, starring Swaran Lata and Nazer while Yadgaar was his first film as a director. He rose to fame from commercially successful Naila which released in 1965 and was based on the novel of the same name by Razia Butt. In 1966, he directed his first Punjabi film Laado. In 1971, he directed Dosti which was the second Diamond Jubilee film in the cinema at that time.

Filmography

Awards and nominations 
Nayyar received three Nigar Awards in his career;
 1965 – Best Director for Naila (1965 film)
 1971 – Best Director for Dosti (1971 film)
 1999 - Millennium Special Award from Nigar Awards

References

External links 
 Sharif Nayyar on IMDb website

1922 births
2007 deaths
Pakistani film directors
Pakistani screenwriters
Nigar Award winners